Amblypalpis olivierella, the tamarix spindle-gall moth, is a species of moth in the family Gelechiidae. It was described by Émile Louis Ragonot in 1886. It is found in Tunisia, Algeria, Libya, the Sinai, Egypt, Israel, Jordan, northern Yemen and the United Arab Emirates, Iran, India and Pakistan.

The larvae have been recorded inducing galls on Tamarix brachystylis, Tamarix bounopaea, Tamarix articulata and Tamarix africana.

References

Gelechiinae
Moths described in 1886
Moths of Africa
Moths of Asia